D. nanus may refer to:
 Dendrocopos nanus, the brown-capped woodpecker, a bird species found in Pakistan, India and Sri Lanka
 Dendropsophus nanus, a frog species found in Argentina, Bolivia, Brazil, Paraguay and Uruguay

See also
 Nanus (disambiguation)